Hamdan Zoelva (born 21 June 1962 in Bima, West Nusa Tenggara) is an Indonesian politician and lawyer. He was the chief justice of the Indonesian Constitutional Court from 2013 to 2015, replacing Akil Mochtar whose appointment was terminated on bribery case during election dispute in Lebak Regency, Banten. He also has served as former leaders of the Crescent Star Party.

Childhood
Zoelva born to TG. KH. Muhammad Hasan, who is the leader of Al-Mukhlisin boarding school in Bima, and Hj. Siti Zaenab. Zoelva spent his childhood in the village of Parado, about 50 kilometers from the city of Bima. He grew up in a family tradition and schooled students at Government Elementary School.

As the chief justice of the Indonesian Constitutional Court
Zoelva appointed chief justice of the Constitutional Court of the Republic of Indonesia, replacing Akil Mochtar, which was dismissed on 5 October 2013 as set out as a suspect in a bribery dispute over local elections, gratuities, and money laundering. Zoelva was selected through two rounds of voting mechanism. This selection followed by 8 judges constitution, namely Zoelva, Harjono, Arief Hidayat, Anwar Usman, Ahmad Fadhil Sumadi, Patrialis Akbar, Muhammad Alim, and Maria Farida Indrati, and chaired by Hamdan Zoelva himself.

Zoelva's appointment as chief justice of the Constitutional Court had experienced polemic considering his status as a former politician Crescent Star Party. Zoelva stated that he had taken off all his political positions and activities since served become constitutional judges.

Private life 
Zoelva married to R.A. Nina Damayanti and has three children, namely Muhammad Faris Aufar, Arya Ahmad Hanafi, A. Adib Karamy. Zoelva has a hobby of playing golf and speak English active and passive Arabic.

References

External links 
 Hamdan Zoelva profiles at Constitutional Court of Indonesia sites
 Hamdan Zoelva profiles at Kompas.com

1962 births
Crescent Star Party (Indonesia) politicians
Hasanuddin University alumni
21st-century Indonesian judges
Indonesian Muslims
Justices of the Constitutional Court of Indonesia
Living people
Members of the People's Representative Council, 1999
Padjadjaran University alumni
People from Bima Regency